is the name of a Japanese miso soup paste producer. Its headquarters are located in the city of Nagano. Marukome accounts for about 13% of the amount of miso produced in Japan each year which makes them one of the top in production volume among 2,500 miso producers in Japan.

On December 5, 2007, Marukome USA, Inc. opened its United States headquarters and factory in Irvine, California.

As a commercial gimmick, Marukome has organized contests for kids to become "Marukome Boy" (マルコメくん) who subsequently represents the company in advertisement. To be a winner, the Marukome Boy should look similar to the company logo of a small boy with a bald head.

Marketing
In 2017 Marukome launched two types of organic miso powder in a collaboration with Australian model Miranda Kerr, with the model providing her personal input into the creation of the new products.

References

External links
Marukome 
Marukome USA 

Condiment companies
Food and drink companies of Japan
Companies based in Nagano Prefecture
Food and drink companies established in 1854
Japanese brands
Soy product brands
Japanese companies established in 1854